Pasjak may refer to:

 Pasjak, Matulji, a village in the municipality of Matulji, Croatia
 , a village in the municipality of Gjilan
 , a village in the city of Kruševac, Serbia

See also 

 Pajsak (until 1979 – Pasjak, until 1965 the same – Pajsak), a village in the municipality of Trstenik, Serbia